Argyll is an ancient shire and modern registration county of Scotland.

Argyll can also refer to:
in Scotland
Argyllshire (UK Parliament constituency) (1708–1983)
Argyll and Bute, one of 32 unitary authority council areas in Scotland and a lieutenancy area
Argyll and Bute (UK Parliament constituency)
Argyll and Bute (Scottish Parliament constituency)
Diocese of Argyll, a medieval bishopric
Bishop of Argyll (12th–17th centuries), the ecclesiastical head of the Diocese of Argyll
Duke of Argyll, a title in the Peerage of Scotland since 1701 and in the Peerage of the United Kingdom since 1892
Argyll (car), a Scottish motor car marque manufactured from 1899 to 1932, and again from 1976 to around 1990
Argyll jacket, a shorter than regular jacket with gauntlet cuffs and pocket flaps and front cutaway for wearing with a sporran and kilt

Other
Argyll, Edmonton, a residential neighbourhood in Alberta, Canada
Argyll Foods, a defunct British supermarket chain, later part of Safeway (UK)
HMS Argyll, several ships of the Royal Navy
Argyll CMS, Color Management Software
 Argyll Street, a road in Central London
Argyll, Queensland, a locality in Australia

See also
Argyle (disambiguation)
Argyll and Bute (disambiguation)
Argyll and Clyde, an operational area of the Crown Office and Procurator Fiscal Service
Argyll and Sutherland Highlanders, a battalion of the Royal Regiment of Scotland
Argyll and Sutherland Highlanders of Canada (Princess Louise's)
Argyll Robertson pupil, a bilateral small pupil that constricts when the patient focuses on a near object; named after Douglas Moray Cooper Lamb Argyll Robertson
Argyll Foods, big supermarket operator in the United Kingdom
Bishop of Argyll and the Isles (disambiguation)
Diocese of Argyll and the Isles (disambiguation)
Duke of Argyll's tea tree – see wolfberry
Earl of Argyll's Regiment of Foot
Glasgow Mid Argyll, a shinty club
NHS Highland and Argyll, one of the fourteen regions of the Scottish National Health Service
NHS Argyll and Clyde, a former health board area
Argile (disambiguation)
Argle (disambiguation)